Stephen Chan  (b. 1949) is an author and Professor of World Politics at SOAS, University of London. He was appointed an OBE for "services to Africa and higher education" in 2010. He has published number of books on international relations and articles and reviews in the academic and specialist press, as well as journalistic feature articles.

Biography 
Born to Chinese refugees to New Zealand, Stephen Chan received his Bachelor of Arts and Master of Arts at the University of Auckland. He then did another Master of Arts at King's College London, prior to his PhD at the University of Kent. He began his academic career in Africa at the University of Zambia in 1983, and has subsequently been a visiting lecturer at the University of Wellington and held academic posts at the University of Kent and Nottingham Trent University, before joining SOAS in 2002.

In 2010, he won the International Studies Association prize, Eminent Scholar in Global Development.

Authored books

References

Living people
1949 births
University of Auckland alumni
Alumni of King's College London
Alumni of the University of Kent
Academic staff of the University of Zambia
Academics of SOAS University of London
Officers of the Order of the British Empire
New Zealand people of Chinese descent
New Zealand emigrants to the United Kingdom